Sceptrin is a bioactive marine isolate. It has been isolated from the marine sponge Agelas conifera and appears to have affinity for the bacterial actin equivalent MreB. As such, this compound possess antibiotic potential.

See also
 Ageliferin
 Prokaryotic cytoskeleton

References

Imidazoles
Bromoarenes
Halogen-containing natural products
Cyclobutanes
Antibiotics
Carboxamides